Aegna is an Estonian island in the Bay of Tallinn in the Baltic Sea.  Administratively it is part of the city of Tallinn, the capital of Estonia and is a sub district of the Kesklinn (City center) district.

Geography
Aegna island has an area of 3 km2, and can be found off the Viimsi peninsula, around 1.5 km NW of Rohuneeme and 14 km north of Tallinn. It has a 10 km coastline which includes two sandy beaches. The island's highest point is about 13 m above sea level.

, Aegna had 16 permanent residents.

Attractions
Aegna is a popular destination for day and camping trips, and has around 15 km of walking routes. There is also a WDS Aegna Meditation and Development Centre, opened in the summer time. On the island stands the Eerikukivi, a glacial erratic declared  Protected Natural Monument.

History
Aegna's history dates back thousands of years, but the first written accounts of the island go back to 1297,  when Danish king Erik Menved prohibited forestry on the islands of Naissaar and Aegna. Northern Estonia or Estland was also part of Denmark over a century, including Aegna. Historically, the population of Aegna has been mixed with predominantly Estonian and Swedish inhabitants. Inhabitants of the island were mostly fishermen.

Aegna has been used for military purposes during the Imperial Russia, Republic of Estonia and Soviet occupation time of Estonia. Military remains that can still be seen include those of a military watchtower, a large gun battery with tunnels, and the light railway used in its construction.

On 10 August 2005 a Copterline helicopter on Tallinn–Helsinki route crashed 3 km south of the island. All 14 people on the helicopter died.

Transport
The small ferry Juku operates to and from the island during the summer months, with support from the city of Tallinn.  In the summer of 2010 the Juku was operated by Kihnu Veeteed

During the summer Tallinn-Cruises operate sightseeing tours to the island using the boat "Monica" 

The island can also be reached by boats or yachts chartered from Pirita Harbour 

In 2022 a new ferry was introduced, reducing the journey time to Aegna to 30 minutes. The Vegtind can accommodate 100 passengers and 20 bicycles, and is operated by the company Spinnaker.

Port

The Port of Aegna (port code EE AEN) is a seaport situated on the southern coast of Aegna.

See also
List of islands of Estonia
Transport in Estonia

References

External links
Island information

Islands of Estonia
Subdistricts of Tallinn
Landforms of Tallinn
Kesklinn, Tallinn
Tourist attractions in Tallinn